Louis Le Cardonnel (22 February 1862 – 28 May 1936) was a Roman Catholic priest and French poet. He won two literary prizes from the Académie française.

Early life
Louis Le Cardonnel was born on 22 February 1862 in Valence, Drôme, France. He was of Irish descent. His father, Louis Aimable Le Cardonnel, was an engineer. His mother, Amély Joséphine Cumin, was the owner of a clothing shop. His brother, Georges Le Cardonnel, was a novelist and critic.

Le Cardonnel briefly attended a seminary in Issy-les-Moulineaux before dropping out. He subsequently attended another seminary in Rome, and he was an ordained as a Roman Catholic priest in 1896.

Career
Le Cardonnel served as a priest until 1900, when he joined the Order of Saint Benedict and became an oblate. He subsequently served as the vicar of the Église Saint-Jean-Baptiste in Pierrelatte.

Le Cardonnel began composing poetry in 1881. He began composing poetry while he was a priest in France, then resumed poetry in Tuscany, Italy for nine years. He was influenced by classical antiquity and the Celtic culture. His main themes were the seasons, especially the autumn, melancholy, death, and the Crusades. His poetic style emphasized the sounds of vowels and alliterations.

Le Cardonnel won two literary prizes from the Académie française: the Prix Capuran for Poèmes in 1905, and the Prix Broquette-Gonin for Carmina sacra in 1913.

Death
Le Cardonnel died on 28 May 1936 in Avignon.

Works

Further reading

References 

1862 births
1936 deaths
French people of Irish descent
People from Valence, Drôme
19th-century French poets
20th-century French poets
French Roman Catholic priests